Uren may refer to:

Places 

Uren, Saskatchewan, a community in Saskatchewan, Canada
Uren Urban Settlement, a municipal formation which the town of district significance of Uren in Urensky District of Nizhny Novgorod Oblast, Russia is incorporated as
Uren, Russia, a town in Urensky District of Nizhny Novgorod Oblast, Russia
Urén, Michoacán, a locality in Michoacán, Mexico
Uren River, a river in Costa Rica

People 

Clarrie Uren (1900–?), Australian football player
Dick Uren (1926–2010), English rugby player
Harold Uren (1885–?), English football player
Jeff Uren (1925–2007), British racing driver
Malcolm Uren (1900–1973), Australian journalist
Michael Uren (born 1923), British businessman and philanthropist
Tom Uren (1921-2015), Australian politician

See also
Urine